Taşoluk is a village in Gülnar district of  Mersin Province, Turkey. It is in the mountainous area to the west of Gülnar. The population of Taşoluk was 161 as of 2012.

References

Villages in Gülnar District